Heidrun Hartmann, née Heidrun Elsbeth Klara Osterwald (born 5 August 1942 Kolberg; died 11 July 2016) was a German botanist.

She worked at the University of Hamburg and specialised in Aizoaceae, Crassulaceae, collected plants from Africa and South America.

She was honoured in 1995 when botanist Steven Allen Hammer published Hartmanthus an African genus of tropical, succulent flowering plants in the family Aizoaceae.

References

1942 births
2016 deaths
People from Kołobrzeg
Academic staff of the University of Hamburg
20th-century German botanists